Samuel William Wayte (28 October 1819 – 1898) was an English academic administrator at the University of Oxford.

At Trinity College, Oxford, Wayte was a Scholar from 1838 to 1842 and a Fellow from 1842 to 1866. He was Secretary to the Commissioners from 1854 to 1858 and in 1866 he was elected President of Trinity College in succession to John Wilson. Wayte retired as President in 1878, announcing his retirement decision in August of that year.

References

1819 births
1898 deaths
Alumni of Trinity College, Oxford
Fellows of Trinity College, Oxford
Presidents of Trinity College, Oxford
19th-century English Anglican priests